"Dream Glow" is a song by Jin, Jimin and Jungkook of the South Korean boy band BTS and British singer Charli XCX, released as a single on June 7, 2019. It was produced by Stargate, and is the first song from the soundtrack of their BTS World game, released on June 26.

Background
"Dream Glow" is a reworked version of an unreleased Charli XCX song that was titled "Glow". "Glow" was written in 2016 during writing sessions for XCX's unreleased third studio album. XCX initially planned to include the song on the album, but ultimately decided not to as she stated that "it never quite fit in my world in its original form".

In 2017, Charli XCX met BTS in Seoul, South Korea, when she was in the country performing for a festival. During their meeting, they decided to work on a song together. XCX would later send them her version of "Glow" as a potential song to use, and it was eventually chosen as the song for their collaboration. The group "sat with it for a while" in order to tweak the song and also adapt it to fit the Korean language.

Charli XCX's version of the song leaked in 2018, XCX stated that the song was originally about "falling in love with someone in the club [because] they had that "glow" about them".

The song is credited as being "part one" of the soundtrack to the Netmarble mobile game BTS World.

Critical reception
Sheldon Pearce of Pitchfork gave the track a positive review, saying Jin, Jimin and Jungkook "don't miss a beat, with Charli filling the vacant spaces to maintain their carefully arranged synchronicity". Pearce also said that the four "sing vaguely but assuredly, in English and Korean, about the yet-to-be-realized potential of dreams", calling it "starry-eyed but not fanciful", "nearly pessimist-proof" and "pristine EDM-lite".

Track listing

Charts

Release history

References

2019 singles
2019 songs
BTS songs
Charli XCX songs
Songs written by Charli XCX
Songs written by Ryn Weaver
Songs written by Mikkel Storleer Eriksen
Songs written by Tor Erik Hermansen
Song recordings produced by Stargate (record producers)
Macaronic songs
Male–female vocal duets
Hybe Corporation singles